Diener is a morgue worker responsible for handling, moving, and cleaning the corpse.

Diener may also refer to:
 Diener & Diener, an architectural firm established in Basel, Switzerland

People with the surname 
 Bertha Eckstein-Diener (1874–1948), Austrian writer
 Carl Diener (1862–1928), Austrian geographer, geologist and paleontologist
 Christian Diener (born 1993), German backstroke swimmer
 Drake Diener (born 1981), American professional basketball player
 Ed Diener (born 1946), American psychologist, professor and author
 Emil Diener, Swiss bobsledder
 Gottfried Diener (1926–2015), Swiss bobsledder
 James Diener, American music executive and entrepreneur
 Joan Diener (1930–2006), American theatre actress and singer
 John V. Diener(1887–1937), American politician
 Marie Diener-West, American biostatistician and epidemiologist
 Melanie Diener (born 1967), German operatic and concert soprano
 Robert Biswas-Diener (born 1972), American psychologist and author
 Theodor Otto Diener (born 1921), American plant pathologist
 Travis Diener (born 1982), American professional basketball player
 Verena Diener (born 1949), Swiss politician